Chi Virginis b (also known as HD 110014 b) is an extrasolar planet which orbits the K-type giant star Chi Virginis, located approximately 294 light years away in the constellation Virgo. This planet has mass at least 11 times that of Jupiter and takes 835 days to orbit the star twice the distance as Earth from the Sun. This planet was discovered in July 2009 using the radial velocity method.

See also 
 70 Virginis b
 HD 16760 b

References 
 

Exoplanets discovered in 2009
Giant planets
Virgo (constellation)
Exoplanets detected by radial velocity